Urbansee is a lake of Carinthia, Austria.

External links
 Information from the Carinthian Institute of Limnology

Lakes of Carinthia (state)